The Wichita State Shockers women's basketball team is the NCAA Division I college basketball program representing Wichita State University in Wichita, Kansas. The team is a member of the American Athletic Conference, after 43 seasons in the Missouri Valley Conference.

History
Wichita State began play in 1905. They have played in Division I since 1974. As of the end of the 2015–16 season, they have an all-time record of 556–631. They have made the NCAA Tournament in the three years they've won the Missouri Valley Conference title, in 2013, 2014, and 2015. They have made the WNIT four times 1999, 2000, 2011, 2012), and the WBI once (2010). Jody Adams had coached the team since 2008 (with the team winning a school record 29 games in 2014, though they finished with 8 wins the next season) until her departure was announced on January 22, 2017. Adams was replaced by Kansas native, Keitha Adams of University of Texas at El Paso (UTEP).

NCAA tournament results

References

External links